United States v. Oppenheimer, 242 U.S. 85 (1916), was a landmark Supreme Court decision applying the common law concept of res judicata (literally: the thing is decided) to criminal law cases.

Prior history 

On error from the United States District Court for the Southern District of New York:

The defendant and others were indicted for a conspiracy to conceal assets from a trustee in bankruptcy. The defendant Oppenheimer set up a previous adjudication upon a former indictment for the same offense that it was barred by the one-year statute of limitations in the bankruptcy act for offenses against that act; an adjudication since held to be wrong in another case. This defense was presented in four forms entitled respectively, demurrer, motion to quash, plea in abatement, and plea in bar. After motion by the Government that the defendant be required to elect which of the four he would stand upon he withdrew the last-mentioned two, and subsequently the court granted what was styled the motion to quash, ordered the indictment quashed and discharged the defendant without day. The Government brings this writ of error treating the so-called motion to quash as a plea in bar, which in substance it was.

Holding

The holding, as delivered by Justice Holmes:

Rules of law applied

A "motion to quash" an indictment, based upon a former adjudication that a previous indictment for the same offense was barred by the statute of limitations, held, in substance, a plea in bar.

Under the Criminal Appeals Act of March 2, 1907, c. 2564, 34 Stat. 1246, the right to review decisions and judgments sustaining special pleas in bar is not limited to cases in which the decisions or judgments are based upon the invalidity or construction of the statutes upon which the indictments are founded.

A plea of the statute of limitations is a plea to the merits.

A judgment for defendant that the prosecution is barred by limitations goes to his liability in substantive law; and, in whatever form the issue was raised, such a judgment may be interposed as a conclusive bar to another prosecution for the same offense.

The Fifth Amendment, in providing that no one should be twice put in jeopardy, was not intended to supplant the fundamental principle of res judicata in criminal cases.

See also
Res judicata
Double jeopardy
Due process
List of United States Supreme Court cases, volume 242

References

External links
 
 

United States Double Jeopardy Clause case law
United States Supreme Court cases
1916 in United States case law
United States criminal procedure case law
United States Supreme Court cases of the White Court